Around a Million is a 1924 German silent film directed by Joseph Delmont and starring Harry Hardt, Dary Holm and Wilhelm Diegelmann.

Cast

References

Bibliography

External links

1924 films
Films of the Weimar Republic
German silent feature films
Films directed by Joseph Delmont
German black-and-white films
1920s German films